Douglas Thomas Clemens (born April 21, 1968) is a Democratic member of the Missouri General Assembly representing the State's 72nd House district.

Career
Clemens won the election on 6 November 2018 from the platform of Democratic Party. He secured sixty-four percent of the vote while his closest rival Republican Bruce Buwalda secured thirty-seven percent.

Electoral History

References

1968 births
21st-century American politicians
Living people
Clemens, Doug